United World Colleges (UWC) is an international network of schools and educational programmes with the shared aim of "making education a force to unite people, nations and cultures for peace and a sustainable future." The organization was founded on the principles of German educator Kurt Hahn in 1962 to promote intercultural understanding.

Today, UWC consists of 18 colleges on four continents. Young people from more than 155 countries are selected through a system of national committees and pursue the International Baccalaureate Diploma; some of the schools are also open to younger years (from kindergarten). UWC runs the world’s largest scholarship programme in international secondary education, with over 80% of students selected by UWC national committees to attend one of the colleges receiving financial support. To date, there are almost 60,000 UWC alumni from all over the world.

The current President of UWC is Queen Noor of Jordan (1995–present). Former South African President Nelson Mandela was joint President (1995–1999) alongside Queen Noor, and subsequently Honorary President of UWC (1999–2013). Former UWC presidents are Lord Mountbatten (1968–1977) and when he was the Prince of Wales, King Charles III (1978–1995).

The movement, including the colleges and national committees, are linked and coordinated by UWC International, which consists of the UWC International Board, the UWC International Council, and the UWC International Office (UWCIO), based in London and Berlin. These entities work together to set the global strategy for the movement, oversee fundraising, and approve new colleges. Faith Abiodun, who joined the movement in 2021, serves as executive director of the International Office, and Musimbi Kanyoro has been the chair of the International Board since 2019.

History
UWC was originally founded in the early 1960s to bridge the social, national and cultural divides apparent during the Second World War, and exacerbated by the Cold War. The first college in the movement, UWC Atlantic College in Wales, United Kingdom, was founded in 1962 by Kurt Hahn, a German educator who had previously founded Schule Schloss Salem in Germany, Gordonstoun in Scotland, the Outward Bound movement, and the Duke of Edinburgh's Award Scheme.

Hahn envisaged a college educating boys and girls aged 16 to 19. He believed that schools should not simply be a means for preparing to enter university, but should help students prepare for life by developing resilience and the ability to experience both successes and failures. The selection would be based on personal motivation and potential, regardless of any social, economic or cultural factors. A scholarship programme would facilitate the recruitment of young people from different socio-economic backgrounds.

Louis Mountbatten was involved with Atlantic College from its early days, and encouraged the organization to adopt the name "United World Colleges" and to open an international office with operations distinct from that of Atlantic College, to indicate a global reach and ambition beyond a single college. In 1967 he became the first president of the United World Colleges, a position he held until 1977. Lord Mountbatten supported the organization by gaining support from heads of state and politicians, and in fundraising activities. Under his presidency, the United World College of South East Asia was established in Singapore in 1971 (formally joining the UWC movement in 1975), followed by the United World College of the Pacific in Victoria, British Columbia, in 1974.

The Colleges

There are currently 18 UWC schools and colleges in operation, with an international office in London and Berlin. UWC Simón Bolivar was a member of the movement until its closing in 2012 by the Venezuelan government. 

The location and opening date (and, for those that joined the UWC movement after being founded as an independent institution, their joining year) for each United World College is given below: 
 United World College of the Atlantic (Llantwit Major, Wales), 1962
 Lester B. Pearson United World College of the Pacific (Victoria, British Columbia, Canada), 1974
 UWC South East Asia (Singapore), founded 1971, joined UWC 1975
 Waterford Kamhlaba United World College of Southern Africa (Mbabane, Eswatini), founded 1963, joined UWC 1981
 UWC-USA (Montezuma, New Mexico), 1982
 UWC Adriatic (Duino, Italy), 1982
 Simón Bolívar United World College of Agriculture (Ciudad Bolívar, Venezuela), founded 1986, joined UWC 1987, closed 2012
 Li Po Chun United World College (Wu Kai Sha, Hong Kong), 1992
 UWC Red Cross Nordic (Flekke, Norway), 1995
 UWC Mahindra (Village Khubavali, India), 1997
 UWC Costa Rica (Santa Ana, Costa Rica), founded 2000, joined UWC 2006
 UWC Mostar (Mostar, Bosnia and Herzegovina), 2006
 UWC Maastricht (Maastricht, Netherlands), founded 1984, joined UWC 2009
 UWC Robert Bosch (Freiburg, Germany), 2014
 UWC Dilijan (Dilijan, Armenia), 2014
UWC Changshu China (Changshu, China), 2015
 UWC Thailand (Phuket, Thailand), founded 2008, joined UWC 2016
 UWC ISAK Japan (Karuizawa, Japan), founded 2014, joined UWC 2017
UWC East Africa (Kilimanjaro and Arusha, Tanzania), founded 1969, joined UWC 2019

Academics 
UWC values experiential learning alongside providing its 16–19-year-old students with the International Baccalaureate (IB) Diploma, an internationally recognised pre-university educational programme developed in close collaboration with UWC in the late 1960s. The IB Diploma Programme was co-developed by UWC Atlantic College, the Geneva International School and the United Nations School in New York in 1968 and aims "to develop students who have excellent breadth and depth of knowledge – students who flourish physically, intellectually, emotionally and ethically". Today, UWC and the IB Organisation continue to work closely together to develop new curricula and shaping international education.

Five UWC schools (UWC Thailand, UWC South East Asia in Singapore, UWC Maastricht in the Netherlands, UWC East Africa in Tanzania and Waterford Kamhlaba UWC of Southern Africa in Eswatini) also offer non-residential educational programmes for younger students aged between 18 months and 15 years.

Meanwhile, some UWC schools and colleges offer a Pre-IB Year, as a preparation year for students before they begin their IB Diploma Programme. UWC schools and colleges that offer the Pre-IB Programme include, UWC Changshu in China, UWC South East Asia in Singapore, Waterford Kamhlaba UWC of Southern Africa in Eswatini, UWC Thailand, UWC ISAK Japan and UWC East Africa in Tanzania.

Co-curricular Activities 
The UWC education nurtures students' whole person development by having the 'Creativity, Activity, Service' Programme (CAS) at its core. Each UWC school and college offers CAS activities under different names but similarly offers a wide range of both faculty and student led activities.

Funding 
The UWC model relies heavily on funding support of different philanthropists as well as national governments. In its early years, the United World College of the Atlantic and the UWC International Office were funded by the donations and grants from the Ford Foundation, the Dulverton Trust, and the Bernard Sunley trust, in addition to the British and West German governments, and many smaller funders; the site for Atlantic College, St Donat's Castle, was donated for the college by Antonin Besse II. The colleges in Italy and Canada, in particular, receive significant support and funding from their national and local governments.

More recently, the Davis-UWC Scholars Program was launched by Shelby M.C. Davis in 2000 and now supports UWC graduates to study at 99 selected US colleges and universities, and has grown to become the world's largest, privately funded, international scholarship program. In 2018, the Davis-UWC Dare to Dream Programme was launched with the support of Shelby M. C. Davis. In 2020, UWC announced a partnership with the Schmidt Futures and the Rhodes Trust, the Rise Programme, through which 15 students with refugee backgrounds will receive all-inclusive scholarships to attend across 3 years from 2021 to 2023, and further educational programmes will be delivered at Kakuma refugee camp in Kenya.

Notable alumni

Politics and government
 Ashley Bloomfield: New Zealand's Director-General of Health and Chief Executive of New Zealand's Ministry of Health 
Ian Khama: Former President of Botswana
 Julie Payette: Governor General of Canada 2017-2021 and astronaut
 Douglas Alexander: British politician, who served as Scottish Secretary, Transport Secretary, and International Development Secretary in the Blair and Brown cabinets
 Lene Feltman Espersen: former Minister of Foreign Affairs, Denmark
 Eluned Morgan: Welsh politician, member of the House of Lords and former member of the European Parliament
 Lindiwe Sisulu: Minister of Defence and Military Veterans in South Africa
 Lousewies van der Laan: Dutch politician, Vice President of the European Liberal Democrats, Chief of Staff to the President of the International Criminal Court
 Corinne Ellemeet: Dutch Member of Parliament 
 David Cunliffe: New Zealand Member of Parliament 
 Chrystia Freeland: Current Canadian Deputy Prime Minister and Minister of Finance, Former Minister of Intergovernmental Affairs, Minister of Foreign Affairs, Federal Minister of Foreign Trade, journalist and member of the Canadian Parliament
 Niki Ashton: Canadian Member of Parliament
 Tim Owen QC: British human rights barrister
 Jakob von Weizsäcker: German politician, chief economist of the German Ministry of Finance, Member of the European Parliament
 Marina Catena: Director United Nations World Food Programme and Lieutenant Italian Army
 Pilvi Torsti: Finnish politician and historian
 Xochitl Torres Small: Current U.S. Under Secretary of Agriculture for Rural Development, Former Member of the U.S. House of Representatives from New Mexico's 2nd congressional district
 Yuen Pau Woo: Singaporian-Canadian academic and politician
 Kim Han-sol: Grandson of Kim Jong-il
 King Willem-Alexander: King of The Netherlands
Princess Raiyah bint Hussein: Princess of Jordan
Princess Elisabeth, Duchess of Brabant: heir to the Belgian Crown
 Zenani Mandela-Dlamini
 Wang Guangya: Chinese diplomat, former Director of the Hong Kong and Macau Affairs Office of the State Council of the People's Republic of China
 Nadiem Anwar Makarim: current Minister of Education, Culture, Research, and Technology of the Republic of Indonesia
 Paul Francis Grimes: senior Australian public servant. Former Secretary of the Australian Government Department of Agriculture
 David Moinina Sengeh: Minister of Education and Chief Innovation Officer, Sierra Leone
 João Pedro Cravinho: Foreign Affairs Minister of Portugal, and former Defense Minister

Business
 Pentti Kouri: Finnish economist and venture capitalist
 Robert Milton: Chairman, President and CEO of ACE Aviation Holdings Inc. and Chairman of Air Canada
 Jorma Ollila: former chairman and CEO of Nokia Corporation
 Peter Sands: CEO of Standard Chartered
 Robin Chase: co-founder and the first CEO of Zipcar
 Todd Sampson: CEO of Leo Burnett, Sydney, co-creator of the Earth Hour initiative
 Tellef Thorleifsson: CEO of Norfund
 Hakeem Belo-Osagie: Nigerian businessman (energy, finance and telecommunications)
 Eyal Ofer: Israeli businessman (real estate and shipping)
 Darren Huston: Canadian businessman, former president and CEO of Priceline and Booking.com

Arts and media
 Sally El Hosaini: Award-winning Film-maker, Screen International's UK Stars of Tomorrow 2009.
 Anne Enright: Irish author, 2007 winner of the Man Booker Prize
 Richard E. Grant: Swazi-English actor of Withnail & I fame and 2019 Academy Award nominee for Best Supporting Actor Can You Ever Forgive Me
 J. Nozipo Maraire: Zimbabwean-born doctor, entrepreneur and writer.
 Karen Mok: Hong-Kong singer, actress and songwriter, three-time Golden Melody Award-winner
 Wangechi Mutu: Kenyan artist and 2010 Deutsche Bank Artist of the Year
 Aki Sasamoto: New York-based Japanese artist
 Eric Khoo: film director from Singapore
 Ashraf Johaardien: playwright from South Africa
 Sonam Kapoor: Indian actor
 Juan Pablo Di Pace: Actor
 Hernán Jiménez: Comedian and film director from Costa Rica
 Tara Sharma: Indian actress
 Sophie Hawley-Weld: Singer for band Sofi Tukker
Valeria Luisello: Writer from México.
 Emma Tucker: British journalist, editor of The Sunday Times
 Saba Douglas-Hamilton: conservationist and TV presenter
 Iqbaal Ramadhan: Indonesian Actor and Musician
 Nicholas Dawes, South African journalist and editor
 Anne Enright: Irish author and writer
 Aernout van Lynden: Dutch-british journalist/ war correspondent
 Luke Harding: British journalist and author
 Lina Attalah: Egyptian journalist
 Juan Pablo Di Pace: Argentinian actor

Academics
 Alison Donnell: English Professor and Head of School of Literature and Languages at University of Reading
 Jonathan Michie: Director of the Department for Continuing Education and President of Kellogg College, University of Oxford
 Gina Neff: Professor of Sociology, Oxford University and Senior Research Fellow, Christ Church, Oxford
 Howard Newby: Vice-Chancellor of the University of Liverpool
 Ghil'ad Zuckermann: Chair of Linguistics and Endangered Languages, University of Adelaide.
 Shawkat Toorawa: Professor of Arabic Studies, Yale University.
 Pavlos, Crown Prince of Greece
 Stephan Klasen: Professor of Development Economics, University of Göttingen.
 Alan Whiteside: South African academic, researcher and professor, especially known for his work on Aids in Africa.
 Tamar Herzog:  Monroe Gutman Professor of Latin American Affairs at Harvard University
 Jukka-Pekka Onnela: Finnish scientist
 David Rueda: Professor of Comparative Politics at Nuffield College, Oxford University

Other fields
 Akihiko Hoshide: Japanese astronaut
 Malaika Vaz: youngest explorer to reach Antarctica and Arctic.
 Mayumi Raheem: Sri Lankan swimmer, three times gold medal winner at the 2006 South Asian Games
 Paul Colton: Bishop of Cork, Cloyne and Ross, Ireland
 Andreas Loewe: Dean of Melbourne in the Anglican Church of Melbourne

References

External links
 

 
International school associations